The 2021 IIHF World Championship Final was played at the Arena Riga in Riga, Latvia, on 6 June 2021. 

Canada and Finland met for the fifth time in the finals, and also for the second consecutive time, with Finland having won in 2019. Canada won 3–2 in overtime to claim their 27th title.

Road to the final

Match

References

External links
Official website

Final
IIHF World Championship Final
2021
2021 IIHF World Championship Final